Palazzo Barbarigo Nani Mocenigo is a Gothic palace in Venice, Italy located in the Dorsoduro district, along the Nani embankment on the San Trovaso river, near the campo of the same name.

History
The palace dates back to the 15th century and was the residence of the Barbarigo family. The building was part of the dowry that Elena Barbarigo, a daughter of Doge Agostino Barbarigo, brought to her husband Giorgio Nani. From them the palace passed to his son Bernardo, a founder of the family branch named di San Trovaso. In the first half of the 19th century, the San Trovaso branch died out, and the complex became the home of the distant relatives of Nani Mocenigo who previously lived in a building on the Cannaregio district. 

Part of the building still belongs to this family, while the rest was purchased by the Ca' Foscari University, that made it the seat of the Department of Italian Studies, along with an adjoining library. Since 2007, the building has remained empty, sometimes being rented out to wealthy tourists or used for art events. As of 2022 the building is being used as a hotel.

Architecture
The palace is a typical example of Venetian Gothic architecture of the 14-15th centuries. The square-shaped façade has three levels and a mezzanine. The ground floor offers two Gothic portals: the central one and the smaller one on the left. The two noble floors have central quadriforas supported by balustrades and flanked by pairs of ogival single-light windows. The first noble floor has a pair of coats of arms in the wings.

On the right side of the roof there is a terrace overlooking the San Trovaso and Giudecca Canal area.

See also
Palazzo Barbarigo
Palazzo Mocenigo Gambara
Palazzo Nani

References

Houses completed in the 15th century
Palaces in Sestiere Dorsoduro
Gothic architecture in Venice